Sehat Sahulat Program is a flagship social health insurance initiative launched by the Government of Pakistan in 2019 to provide free healthcare services to the underprivileged population of the country. The program is designed to provide financial protection and access to quality healthcare services to the poorest and most vulnerable segments of society.

Under the Sehat Sahulat Program, eligible households are provided with free healthcare services, including hospitalization, surgeries, and diagnostic tests. The program covers a range of health conditions, including cancer, cardiovascular diseases, diabetes, and kidney diseases, among others.

The program is being implemented in collaboration with the National Database and Registration Authority (NADRA), which is responsible for identifying eligible households and issuing health insurance cards. The health insurance cards are being distributed to the beneficiaries free of charge.

References

Healthcare in Pakistan